Nebria kratteri pindica is a subspecies of ground beetle in the Nebriinae subfamily that can be found in Albania, Greece, Italy, and North Macedonia.

References

kratteri pindica
Beetles described in 1830
Beetles of Europe